Magness Arena is a multi-purpose collegiate sports arena in Denver, Colorado. It was built from 1997 to 1999 as part of the Daniel L. Ritchie Center, the sports complex at the University of Denver. It is home to the Denver Pioneers ice hockey and basketball teams. It replaces the former DU Arena which was razed in 1997 to make way for the Ritchie Center. Magness Arena opened September 1999, one month before the Pepsi Center. The arena was voted, "Best New Sports Venue" by Westword in 2000.

About the arena
The arena is named after cable television pioneer Bob Magness, who donated $10 million towards construction costs. It features padded individual seating, two members-only club seating areas, a four-sided video scoreboard, and a concourse with glassed-in views of the adjoining Hamilton Gymnasium and El Pomar Natatorium.  The arena can be identified around the city by the attached , gold-spired Williams Tower, which contains a 65-bell carillon.

The largest hockey crowd in arena history was a game between Denver and Colorado College in 2012, when 6,207 fans attended. The largest non-hockey event in the arena was a 2008 presidential campaign rally for Barack Obama, where about 10,000 people attended. Magness Arena hosted the first of three 2012 U.S. Presidential Debates on October 3, 2012.

Concerts

See also
 List of NCAA Division I basketball arenas

References

External links
Official Website
Magness Arena - Denver Pioneers Official Athletics Site

Sports venues in Denver
Denver Pioneers
Denver Pioneers basketball
Denver Pioneers ice hockey
Basketball venues in Colorado
Indoor ice hockey venues in Colorado
Sports venues completed in 1999
College basketball venues in the United States
College ice hockey venues in the United States
Music venues in Colorado
1999 establishments in Colorado